is an athletic stadium in Tsuruoka, Yamagata, Japan. It is a part of  Komagihara Park, and served as a home venue for NEC Yamagata SC.

External links

Football venues in Japan
Montedio Yamagata
Sports venues in Yamagata Prefecture
Tsuruoka, Yamagata
Sports venues completed in 1990
1990 establishments in Japan